Flagg Township Public Library is a library in Rochelle, Illinois. It is a Carnegie library, designed in 1912 by Claude and Starck. The library joined the National Register on October 25, 1973.

History
As a Carnegie library Flagg Township Public Library was the beneficiary of a grant from Andrew Carnegie for its construction. Often smaller towns and rural areas would band together to petition Carnegie for a grant for a county or area library. Flagg Township Library is one such example of an Illinois township library obtained in this manner.

Architecture
Flagg Township Public Library was built in 1912 and designed by the Madison, Wisconsin-based architectural firm of Claude and Starck. The library is an example of Prairie School. It has brick walls and a ceramic tile roof. Flagg Township Public Library is an example of a Carnegie Library.

Significance
The Flagg Township Public Library was listed on the National Register of Historic Places on October 25, 1973, for its significance in the area of architecture.

Notes

External links

Library buildings completed in 1912
Libraries on the National Register of Historic Places in Illinois
National Register of Historic Places in Ogle County, Illinois
Carnegie libraries in Illinois
Prairie School architecture in Illinois
Education in Ogle County, Illinois
1912 establishments in Illinois
Rochelle, Illinois